Myriospora may refer to:
 Myriospora (alveolate), a genus of parasitic protozoa belonging to the phylum Apicomplexa
 Myriospora (fungus), a genus of lichenized fungi in the family Acarosporaceae